John Graham (born October 22, 1966) is a Canadian professional racing driver. He has driven in numerous road racing series such as IMSA. He also has experience in NASCAR.

Racing career

In 1981, he began his career in the Can-Am series' U2 (under 2-litre) class. In 1982 he joined Gordon Lightfoot diving the Lightfoot Racing March 811 Cosworth. In 1983, he joined Aston Martin driving the "Nimrod" at the 24 hours of Daytona. Over his career he has driven IMSA, WSC, Indy Lights, F2, ALMS, Grand-Am, ARCA, NASCAR Nationwide Series as well as in the Paris-Dakar Rally Raid. He has 9 starts at the 24 Hours of Le Mans, with an LMP675 class win in 2000 with Canadian team Multimatic Motorsports. His podium finishes include the 24 Hours of Daytona, 12 Hours of Sebring, and Petit Le Mans.

Graham was inducted into the Canadian Motorsport Hall of Fame in 2021.

Motorsports career results

24 Hours of Le Mans results

NASCAR
(key) (Bold – Pole position awarded by qualifying time. Italics – Pole position earned by points standings or practice time. * – Most laps led.)

Xfinity Series

ARCA Re/Max Series
(key) (Bold – Pole position awarded by qualifying time. Italics – Pole position earned by points standings or practice time. * – Most laps led.)

References

External links

 

Living people
Racing drivers from Northern Ireland
Canadian racing drivers
NASCAR drivers
ARCA Menards Series drivers
24 Hours of Le Mans drivers
Sportspeople from Belfast
World Sportscar Championship drivers
1966 births

Multimatic Motorsports drivers